Amel Bent Bachir (born 21 June 1985), better known by her stage name Amel Bent, is a French pop singer who gained fame after reaching the semi-finals of season 2 of French TV singing competition Nouvelle Star. She is best-selling artist to come from that competition.

She is currently a "coach" on the similar French talent show The Voice: la plus belle voix.

Biography 

Amel Bent grew up in the Paris suburb of La Courneuve with her Algerian father and Moroccan mother. She has a brother and a sister. Her career jump started after making it to the semi-finals of the reality TV show Nouvelle Star 2, France's version of Pop Idol. Although her performance did not make it to the finals, she was still noticed by some of the show's producers, and would end up making her début album later that year, titled: Un Jour d'été, released in late 2004. The album would sell more than 550,000 copies in France alone, but the success of the album would ultimately be derived from the single "Ma philosophie", which would sell more than 500,000 copies, staying at the No. 1 slot in France for more than six weeks during and after sales.

In 2012, Bent was one of the contestants during the Third Season of Danse avec les stars. She and her partner Christophe Licata finished in second place, but won the celebrity dancing show's Christmas special.

For her single "Je reste" 2011, Bent co-starred with the actor from Metal Hurlant Chronicles Karl E. Landler.

Discography

Albums

Singles 

*Did not appear in the official Belgian Ultratop 50 charts, but rather in the bubbling under Ultratip charts.

Featured in

*Did not appear in the official Belgian Ultratop 50 charts, but rather in the bubbling under Ultratip charts.

Awards

2005 : Nominated at the MTV Europe Music Awards like Best French Act
2006 : Nominated at the NRJ Music Award like Francophone Revelation of the Year
2006 : Win the European Border Breakers Award of The Best French Act
2006 : Win the Victoires de la Musique of The Revelation of the Year
2008 : Nominated at the NRJ Music Award like Francophone Female Artist of the Year
2010 : Nominated at the NRJ Music Award like Francophone Female Artist of the Year
2013 : Nominated at the NRJ Music Award like Francophone Female Artist of the Year

Filmography

Notes

Sources
http://www.last.fm/music/Amel+Bent
http://influence.over-blog.com/article-10167534.html

External links

 Amel Bent Ma Philosophie + Lyrics
 Official MySpace
  Interview with Amel Bent on SoulRnB.com (13/12/10)

1985 births
Living people
People from Joué-lès-Tours
French people of Algerian descent
French people of Moroccan descent
Nouvelle Star participants
Danse avec les stars winners
French rhythm and blues singers
21st-century French dancers
French Muslims
21st-century French singers
21st-century French women singers